Plectocomiinae is a subtribe of plants in the family Arecaceae found in Southeast Asia. Genera in the subtribe are:

Plectocomia – Malesia, Indochina
Myrialepis – Malesia, Malay Peninsula, Sumatra

See also 
 List of Arecaceae genera

References

External links 

 
Arecaceae subtribes